Figure skating was competed at the 2009 Winter Universiade. Skaters competed in the disciplines of men's singles, ladies' singles, pair skating, ice dancing, and synchronized skating. It took place between February 21 and 24, 2009 at the Harbin International Convention Exhibition and Sports Center.

Notes
The compulsory dance was the Paso Doble.

Schedules
(Local Time, UTC +09:00)

 February 21, 2009
 14:10: Ice dancing - compulsory dance
 16:20: Men - short program
 21:25: Pairs - short program
 February 22, 2009
 13:00: Ice dancing - original dance
 15:35: Pairs - free skating
 17:05: Men - free skating
 February 23, 2009
 14:00: Ladies - short program
 18:50: Ice dancing - free dance
 21:50: Synchronized skating - short program
 February 24, 2009
 14:30: Ladies - free skating
 20:00: Synchronized Skating - free skating

Medal table

Results

Men

Ladies

Pairs

Ice dancing

Synchronized skating

External links
 Official site
 

2009
Winter Universiade
2009 Winter Universiade
International figure skating competitions hosted by China